Cole Tyler Koepke (born on May 17, 1998) is an American professional ice hockey left winger currently playing for the Syracuse Crunch in the American Hockey League (AHL) while under contract to the Tampa Bay Lightning of the National Hockey League (NHL). As a member of the Sioux City Musketeers, Koepke was drafted 183rd overall by the Tampa Bay Lightning in the 2018 NHL Entry Draft. He then played three seasons with the Minnesota Duluth Bulldogs men's ice hockey team before joining the Syracuse Crunch of the American Hockey League (AHL).

Early life
Koepke was born on May 17, 1998, in Hermantown, Minnesota, U.S to parents Jim and Julie Koepke. He began playing ice hockey after watching his older brother Travis play the sport. As a student at Hermantown High School, Koepke played defence on their varsity soccer team. He also served as a senior assistant team captain as the hockey team captured the 2015–16 Minnesota State High School Class A title. During the tournament, he scored four goals and two assists in their 11–3 quarterfinals win and finished their state championship run with 11 total points.

Playing career
Following high school, Koepke joined the Sioux City Musketeers of the United States Hockey League (USHL) for two seasons and served as an assistant captain for one. He played 22 games as a rookie, recording five points and time on the penalty kill and the power play, before being sidelined due to a knee injury. Early in the 2017–18 season, Koepke signed a letter of intent with the University of Minnesota Duluth. Leading up to the 2018 NHL Entry Draft, Koepke was ranked 215th among North American skaters by the NHL Central Scouting Bureau. He concluded the season with 28 goals and 39 points in 60 games and was eventually drafted in the sixth round, 183rd overall, by the Tampa Bay Lightning. Following the draft, Koepke was invited to participate in their Development Camp.

Collegiate
Koepke joined the Minnesota Duluth Bulldogs men's ice hockey team as a rookie for their 2018–19 NCAA season. During the season, he often skated on the left wing on a line with Parker Mackay and Justin Richards who helped him record 19 points. At the conclusion of the season, Koepke helped the Bulldogs captured their second-consecutive national championship. The following season, Koepke reigned as the National Collegiate Hockey Conference (NCHC) leader in goals and completed his sophomore season riding a 10-game scoring streak. He ended his sophomore campaign with 33 points in 34 games and earned first-team all-NCHC and second-team All-American honors.

Koepke returned to the Bulldogs for the 2020–21 NCAA season and served as an assistant captain. During his junior season, Koepke lead the team in shots with 115 and finished second on the team in goals. He helped the Bulldogs return to the NCAA finals, recording one goal, as the team lost to the eventual champions University of Massachusetts Minutemen. At the conclusion of the season, Koepke was again named to the first-team all-NCHC and a Hobey Baker Award nominee.

Professional
Koepke officially concluded his collegiate career by signing a two-year entry level contract with the Lightning on April 13, 2021. Following the signing, he joined their American Hockey League (AHL) affiliate, the Syracuse Crunch, for the remainder of the season. In his second game with the Crunch, Koepke scored his first professional goal in a 7–1 win over the Utica Comets.

On October 11, 2022, Koepke made his NHL debut with the Lightning. Koepke skated on the Lightning's third line in a loss to the New York Rangers at Madison Square Garden.

Career statistics

References

External links
 

Living people
1998 births
People from Hermantown, Minnesota
AHCA Division I men's ice hockey All-Americans
American men's ice hockey right wingers
Minnesota Duluth Bulldogs men's ice hockey players
Minnesota Wilderness players
Sioux City Musketeers players
Syracuse Crunch players
Tampa Bay Lightning draft picks
Tampa Bay Lightning players